Jan Jarboe Russell (born in Beaumont, Texas) is an American journalist and non-fiction writer.

Life
Russell graduated from University of Texas at Austin. Her work appears in Texas Monthly.

Works
Cisneros: portrait of a new American, Corona Publishing Company, 1985,

References

External links

Official website

Living people
Year of birth missing (living people)
People from Beaumont, Texas
University of Texas at Austin alumni
Writers from Texas